Sympistis dinalda is a moth of the family Noctuidae first described by Smith in 1908. It is found in the boreal and subboreal parts of Canada. It was formerly known as Homohadena infixa dinalda, a subspecies of Homohadena infixa but was elevated to species level and transferred to the genus Sympistis in 2008.

The wingspan is 30–35 mm.

References

dinalda
Moths described in 1908